Phyllanthopsis arida, the trans-Pecos maidenbush, is a rare plant species endemic to western Texas.

Phyllanthopsis arida is a thornless, dioecious, deciduous, highly branching shrub up to 100 cm tall. Leaves are ovate to obovate, up to 1.0 cm long. Flower solitary or in small clusters, yellow-green, up to 3 mm in diameter. Capsule is hanging, up to 7 mm long.

References

Phyllanthaceae
Flora of Texas
Dioecious plants